is a Japanese voice actress from Okinawa Prefecture who is affiliated with Office Osawa. After debuting as a voice actress in 2017, she played her first main roles in 2018 as Yuuna Yunohana in the anime series Yuuna and the Haunted Hot Springs, Nagisa Aragaki in the anime series Hanebado! and Inca Kasugatani in Fire Force.

Filmography

Anime
2018
Yu-Gi-Oh! VRAINS (Kiku Kamishirakawa)
Hanebado! (Nagisa Aragaki)
Harukana Receive (Narumi Tōi)
Ongaku Shōjo (Shupe Gushiken)
Yuuna and the Haunted Hot Springs (Yuuna Yunohana)
Tsurune (Yūna Hanazawa)
Fire Force (Inca Kasugatani)

2019
The Magnificent Kotobuki (Ady)
Carole & Tuesday (Carole Stanley)
Granbelm (Mangetsu Kohinata)
Fruits Basket (Yuki Soma, Young)

2020
 Bofuri: I Don't Want to Get Hurt, so I'll Max Out My Defense. (Syrup)
Dorohedoro (Life-Giving Sorcerer)
ID: Invaded (Muku Narihisago)
Listeners (Sally Simpson)
My Roomie Is a Dino (Kaede)
Hakushon Daimaō 2020 (Kantarō Yodayama)

2021
Farewell, My Dear Cramer (Nozomi Onda)
Osamake (Aoi Shida)
I've Been Killing Slimes for 300 Years and Maxed Out My Level (Musura)
Battle Game in 5 Seconds (Ringo Tatara)
The Case Study of Vanitas (Louis de Sade)

2022
Delicious Party Pretty Cure (Recipeppi, Ena Nagase, Tomoe Honma)
Vermeil in Gold (Kohakumiya)
Mobile Suit Gundam: The Witch from Mercury (Aliya Mahvash)

2023
The Vexations of a Shut-In Vampire Princess (Karla Amatsu)

Anime films
2021
Farewell, My Dear Cramer: First Touch (Nozomi Onda)
Summer Ghost (Aoi Harukawa)

Video games
2019
Atelier Lulua: The Scion of Arland (Elmerulia Frixell)
Azur Lane: USS Dewey (DD-349)
2021
Dead or Alive Xtreme Venus Vacation (Nanami)

References

External links
Official agency profile 

1994 births
Living people
Japanese video game actresses
Japanese voice actresses
Voice actresses from Okinawa Prefecture
21st-century Japanese actresses